Ruby Grant (born 15 April 2002) is an English footballer who plays for the United States college soccer team North Carolina Tar Heels as a midfielder. She previously played for West Ham United and Arsenal in the FA WSL.

Club career

Arsenal 
Grant came up through the Arsenal youth academy, making her first-team debut during the 2018–19 season in a 4–0 away win against Everton in the FA WSL, appearing as an 82nd minute substitute for Jordan Nobbs. In February 2019, Grant scored a hat trick in a 4–0 FA Cup win against Crawley Wasps in the fourth round proper, her debut in the competition.

West Ham United 
Having agreed to join US college team North Carolina Tar Heels, Grant signed a short-term deal with West Ham United ahead of the 2020–21 season after training with the team during the COVID-19 pandemic. She left West Ham in January 2021 at the conclusion of her contract, with eight appearances in all competitions, including two league starts.

North Carolina Tar Heels 
Grant joined the North Carolina Tar Heels in January 2021 for Spring 2021 season, after the conclusion of the 2020 season was delayed by the COVID-19 pandemic. She made her college debut in a 5–0 win over Delaware on 20 March 2021, and opened her scoring for the Tar Heels with three goals in a 7–0 win against Tennessee on 27 March 2021.

Career statistics

Club 
As of 7 April 2021

Honours 

Arsenal
 Women's Super League: 2018–19

References 

Living people
2002 births
Arsenal W.F.C. players
Women's Super League players
English women's footballers
West Ham United F.C. Women players
North Carolina Tar Heels women's soccer players
English expatriate women's footballers
People from New Barnet
English expatriate sportspeople in the United States
Expatriate women's soccer players in the United States
Women's association football midfielders
England women's youth international footballers